Lattice Group plc was a leading British gas transmission business. It was listed on the London Stock Exchange and was a constituent of the FTSE 100 Index.

History
The Company was established in 2000 when BG Group demerged its UK gas transmission business, formerly known as Transco, and named it Lattice Group.

In October 2002 Lattice Group merged with National Grid plc to form National Grid Transco.

In July 2005 National Grid Transco was renamed National Grid plc to provide 'a unifying identity across its operations'.

Operations
As well as the UK gas transmission network, Lattice Group owned a telecoms business known as 186k.

References

British companies established in 2000
Energy companies established in 2000
Companies formerly listed on the London Stock Exchange
Defunct companies based in London
Oil and gas companies of the United Kingdom
National Grid (Great Britain)
2002 mergers and acquisitions